The Hundred of Milne refers to a cadastral unit (land division). It may refer to:
 Hundred of Milne (Northern Territory)
 Hundred of Milne (South Australia)